Emerson USA Inc., California's Flag and Banner Company is a California based flag manufacturer. Founded in 2003, the company is one of San Francisco's only textile manufacturers.

Markets

San Francisco's economy, although largely based on technology and tourism, was also once a major textile manufacturing city. Over the years however, textile manufacturers, such as Esprit de Corp. Designs, better known as Esprit, and Levi Strauss & Co., better known as Levi's, have largely left San Francisco due to the city's high cost of doing business with the few remaining textile manufacturers.

One that has remained however, is Emerson USA, as the company is able to sustain itself within a community of business customers that advocate “buying local” and US flags that are “made in America.” This gives the company a relatively rare niche market as the typical consumer continues to purchase increasingly larger amounts of textiles that are manufactured in Asia.

In May 2010, Emerson USA was recognized by readers of San Francisco Weekly as the Best Flag Resource in San Francisco.

External links

References

Textile companies of the United States
Manufacturing companies established in 2003
Manufacturing companies based in San Francisco
Privately held companies based in California
2003 establishments in California